Major General Dalvir Singh AVSM, VrC, VSM (born 7 April 1946) is a retired Indian Special Forces officer, a former General Officer of the Indian Army and the recipient of Vir Chakra, India's third-highest War-time gallantry award. He has commanded the 10th Battalion Special Forces, the elite 52 Special Action Group of the NSG, Kilo Force of the Rashtriya Rifles and the Territorial Army (India), with distinction. After retirement from active military service, he has been serving as the Director Training of Rajasthan Police Training Center Jodhpur.

Personal life 

Dalvir Singh was born in a Hindu Jat family in the Loharheri  village, Rohtak in the north Indian state of Haryana, as the son of Tarachand Singh Redhu. After retirement from active military service, in 2004, Dalvir Singh settled in Bikaner in the north-western border state of Rajasthan.

Education
Dalvir Singh is an alumnus of Rashtriya Military School Ajmer where he did his schooling. He graduated from the Indian Military Academy as a Commissioned Officer in 1967.

Dalvir Singh also has an M.Phil. in Defense Studies and has attended Staff College at Defence Services Staff College. He also did Higher Command Course at Army War College, Mhow and was selected for the prestigious Strategic Leadership Course at National Defence College (India).

Military career 
Dalvir Singh was commissioned into the Indian Army Corps of Engineers in 1967 as a Second Lieutenant and served in the Indo-Pakistani War of 1971 as an Army Engineer. In 1972 he opted for the Special Forces and volunteered for probation and cleared it. After clearing the probation as a Lieutenant, Dalvir Singh joined the 10 SF also known as Desert Scorpions, stationed in the arid State of Rajasthan.

Dalvir Singh was also one of the pioneer officers who played a vital role when National Security Guard was set up. He was also part of the 52 Special Action Group (SAG) from National Security Guard which specialized in anti-hijack missions and led many covert operations.

Dalvir Singh famously earned the nickname "Saint Soldier" in Sri Lanka; a name given by LTTE, as he was as humble as a saint in behaviour yet ferocious in battle, like a true soldier. Famous for his humility, he would eat all three meals of the day with his soldiers, every single day in their kitchen.

Dalvir Singh's peers in the Special Force consider him one of the toughest soldiers in the army. He, despite suffering from asthma throughout his life, kept on leading missions and maintained the fitness needed for serving in the Special Forces.

Operation Pawan
Dalvir Singh was the first Indian Special Forces Commanding Officer, along with his unit 10th Battalion Special Forces, to enter Sri Lanka and the last to leave as well. The unit was told that the mission was for 10 to 15 days and can return soon; the unit returned to India after 3 years, from a war-torn Sri Lanka.

As per orders, Dalvir Singh launched his SF team to hit the militants' HQ in the heart of Jaffna town, for searching the defence and for the capture of LTTE senior leadership, and as preliminary to final assault by the infantry troops. The Op which came to be known as the Jaffna University Helidrop Operation, the H-Hour was set at midnight of 11 October 1987. Led by Major Rajiv Nair, the Team Commander of the 10 SF, the first Stick of forty were inserted in the first flight of 2 Mi-8s. As the SF troop tried to hold their ground, waiting for the rest of the detail to reinforce, however, they came under sniper fire. Later on, it came to light that there was an intel leak about the conduct of the OP and there was also confusion about the number of LTTE cadres present at the site.

The LTTE which knew beforehand about the Op as they had tapped into Indian military communication, had already moved in snipers armed with telescopic sights. As the battle raged, they were able to inflict 6 casualties on the SF troops trying to hold the ground. The SF squad of 80, instead of the preplanned 120, was heavily outnumbered yet managed to move out of the open ground and sought refuge in an abandoned house where they holed up while fighting for the next 18 hours, awaiting rescue.

The news of the ambush reached Dalvir Singh and he immediately volunteered to move with the columns of infantry to the area, to establish contact with his SF troop. With utter disregard to his own safety, Dalvir Singh led his relief team to the objective in the face of heavy militant fire. On the way, he spotted the tank troop commanded by Maj. Anil Kaul, and incorporated them into the rescue plan. They came under heavy fire and the tank commander was incapacitated and Dalvir Singh who had never operated tanks before had to take up the command of the tank troops as well and directed them to the designated site.

Dalvir Singh and his relief troops fought for 2 days and extricated the beleaguered SF team of 74 along with its 6 casualties, fighting their way out of the militants' cordon, to the safety of the Palay military headquarters.

Dalvir Singh was awarded Vir Chakra for volunteering and successfully rescuing his soldiers, and for displaying conspicuous courage and valiant leadership in the face of strong militant opposition, as per his award citation.

Higher Command
After leading operations in Sri Lanka as a Commanding Officer, Dalvir Singh also served as Brigade Commander (Field & CI), Sub Area Commander (J&K), Deputy. Director General (Special Ops), Division Commander in OP Rakshak & OP Parakram. He also commanded the elite 52 SAG of National Security Guards, as well as the Counter Insurgency Kilo Force of Rashtriya Rifles which handle Kupwara, Baramulla and Srinagar regions. He also headed India's Territorial Army as its Additional Director General.

Dalvir Singh is also credited as one of the core officers who set up and modernized the training strategies for National Security Guards.  He is also credited for raising the training standards of the Territorial Army (India) while he served as its Additional Director General.

Dalvir Singh finally retired at the rank of Major General even though he was approved for the rank of Lieutenant General, due to personal reasons in 2004.

Post Military Career
Dalvir Singh, after his retirement from active military service, raised the Commando Training division under Rajasthan Police Training Centre in 2007. He has been serving as its Director Training since then. He also raised Thar Falcons, an anti-terror police unit, and under his tutelage, they got selected for guarding Cairn India Oil Field in Barmer, Rajasthan.

Honours and decorations

Vir Chakra Citation

Dalvir Singh was also awarded the Vishisht Seva Medal in 1998 for commanding the 52 SAG of the National Security Guards with distinction, and the Ati Vishisht Seva Medal in 2002 for successfully commanding the Kilo Force.

Dalvir Singh was also honoured with the Mirza Raja Jai Singh I Award by the Maharaja Sawai Man Singh II Museum Trust, for his distinguished service in the Indian Armed Forces. The annual event is held on the occasion of the birth anniversary of Brigadier Maharaja Sawai Bhawani Singh Maha Vir Chakra of Jaipur who incidentally was also once the Commanding Officer of Dalvir Singh's parent unit, the 10th Battalion Special Forces.

See also
Jaffna University Helidrop
Special Forces of India
Special Protection Group

References

Bibliography
 Gen. P. C. Katoch, Saikat Datta, (2013). India's Special Forces: 1: History and Future of Special Forces. VIJ Books (India) Pty Ltd. 
 Col. Anil Kaul, (2006). Better Dead Than Disabled. Parity Paperbacks. 
 Col. V S Yadav, (2012) Employment of Special Forces: Challenges and Opportunities for the Future. Centre for Joint Warfare Studies (New Delhi). 
 Depinder Singh, (1992) The IPKF in Sri Lanka. Trishul Publications. 
 Raj K. Mehta (2010) Lost Victory- The Rise & Fall of LTTE Supremo, V. Prabhakaran. Pentagon Security International. 
  Stephen Heynes (2016) The Bleeding Island-Scars and Wounds. Partridge Publishing India. 
 Sumit Walia (2021) Unbattled Fears: Reckoning the National Security. Lancer Publishers & Distributors.

External links
 NSG
Black Thunder II : Operation to remember
 After 16 days of bloody battle, IPKF finally captures LTTE stronghold Jaffna
 Commando operation to capture LTTE leadership turns disastrous

Indian generals
Living people
Indian Army officers
Recipients of the Vir Chakra
Military personnel from Rajasthan
People from Rohtak
Battles of the Indian Peace Keeping Force
University Helidrop
Operations involving Indian special forces
1946 births
People of the Indian Peace Keeping Force
Army War College, Mhow alumni